Palmer Stadium was a stadium in Princeton, New Jersey, United States.  It hosted the Princeton University Tigers football team, as well as the track and field team.  The stadium held 45,750 people at its peak and was opened in 1914 with a game against Dartmouth.  It closed in 1996 with a game against Dartmouth. Princeton Stadium was built on the site (albeit pushed slightly further north) in 1997.
The building was named for Stephen S. Palmer, a trustee of the university, by his son, Edgar Palmer III.  Like Harvard Stadium, it was horseshoe-shaped (which was modeled after the Greek Olympic Stadium), but was wider, including a full-sized track (around the football field) .  It opened to the south (facing Lake Carnegie) and the grand main entrance was at the north.

It hosted the Division I NCAA Men's Lacrosse Championship in 1981.  From 1936 to its closing, the track's long-jump record was held by Jesse Owens.

Palmer Stadium also hosted the NFL's New York Giants for one exhibition game per year from 1965 -1975, the first ten years seeing them face the Philadelphia Eagles and then the Pittsburgh Steelers in 1975.

References

External links
 A short Palmer Stadium history
 Palmer Stadium from GoPrincetonTigers.com

Henry Janeway Hardenbergh buildings
Defunct college football venues
Princeton Tigers football
Sports venues in New Jersey
American football venues in New Jersey
College lacrosse venues in the United States
College track and field venues in the United States
Lacrosse venues in the United States
NCAA Men's Division I Lacrosse Championship venues
Princeton University buildings
1914 establishments in New Jersey
Sports venues completed in 1914
1997 disestablishments in New Jersey
Sports venues demolished in 1997